Stephan Lauener (1898–1988) was a Swiss skier. He competed at the 1928 Winter Olympics in St. Moritz, where he placed 13th in Nordic combined. He placed sixth in ski jumping at the FIS Nordic World Ski Championships 1925.

References

External links

1898 births
1988 deaths
Swiss male Nordic combined skiers
Olympic Nordic combined skiers of Switzerland
Nordic combined skiers at the 1928 Winter Olympics